The Stone Ministry was the ministry of the fifth Chief Minister of the Northern Territory, Shane Stone. It was sworn in on 26 May 1995, following the Country Liberal Party caucus' election of Stone as party leader following the resignation of Marshall Perron. It was in office until 8 February 1999, when Stone resigned, and was replaced by the ministry of incoming Chief Minister Denis Burke the next day.

First ministry (26 May 1995 – 30 June 1995)

Second ministry (1 July 1995 – 20 June 1996)

Third ministry (21 June 1996 – 1 July 1997)

Fourth ministry (2 July 1997 – 14 September 1997)

Fifth ministry (15 September 1997 – 31 May 1998)

Sixth ministry (1 June 1998 – 18 October 1998)

Seventh ministry (19 October 1998 – 7 December 1998)

Eighth ministry (8 December 1998 – 8 February 1999)

References

Northern Territory ministries